Brayden Sier (born 12 December 1997) is a professional Australian rules footballer who last played for the Collingwood Football Club in the Australian Football League (AFL).

Sier is from Melbourne and played for Marcellin College and Yarra Junior Football League club Banyule. He also played two games for the Northern Knights in the TAC Cup before he was drafted by Collingwood with pick 32 in the 2015 national draft, their first selection. Sier's drafting was described as a surprise due to his inexperience. He played only 18 Victorian Football League games over two seasons because of a string of injuries – a broken wrist, a severe concussion, a back injury which ended his 2016 season, and injuries to his hamstring, eye socket, and foot. In 2018, he was sanctioned by the AFL with a suspended $5000 fine for betting on AFL events during the 2017 AFL season, although the AFL noted that he was remorseful and fully cooperative with the investigation, and that the bets totaled less than $50.

Sier finally broke through at an AFL level in the second half of the 2018 AFL season, when Adam Treloar was sidelined with a serious hamstring injury. Sier debuted in round 15 against the Gold Coast Suns at Carrara Stadium. He averaged 19.5 possessions (including 10.6 contested), four clearances and 4.6 tackles for the year and played in the 2018 AFL Grand Final loss to the West Coast Eagles.

In October 2021, Sier was delisted by Collingwood.

Statistics
Statistics are correct to the end of the 2021 season

|- style="background-color: #eaeaea"
! scope="row" style="text-align:center" | 2016
|
| 35 || 0 || — || — || — || — || — || — || — || — || — || — || — || — || — || —
|-
! scope="row" style="text-align:center" | 2017
|
| 36 || 0 || — || — || — || — || — || — || — || — || — || — || — || — || — || —
|- style="background-color: #eaeaea"
! scope="row" style="text-align:center" | 2018
|
| 36 || 12 || 2 || 0 || 97 || 137 || 234 || 18 || 55 || 0.2 || 0.0 || 8.1 || 11.4 || 19.5 || 1.5 || 4.6
|-
! scope="row" style="text-align:center" | 2019
|
| 36 || 6 || 2 || 1 || 35 || 51 || 86 || 4 || 22 || 0.3 || 0.2 || 5.8 || 8.5 || 14.3 || 0.7 || 3.7
|- style="background-color: #eaeaea"
! scope="row" style="text-align:center" | 2020
|
| 36 || 3 || 1 || 1 || 14 || 38 || 52 || 4 || 10 || 0.3 || 0.3 || 4.7 || 12.7 || 17.3 || 1.3 || 3.3
|-
! scope="row" style="text-align:center" | 2021
|
| 36 || 7 || 1 || 0 || 32 || 54 || 86 || 16 || 19 || 0.1 || 0.0 || 4.6 || 7.7 || 12.3 || 2.3 || 2.7
|- class="sortbottom"
! colspan=3| Career
! 28
! 6
! 2
! 178
! 280
! 458
! 42
! 106
! 0.2
! 0.1
! 6.4
! 10.0
! 16.4
! 1.5
! 3.8
|}

Notes

References

External links

Living people
1997 births
Collingwood Football Club players
Australian rules footballers from Victoria (Australia)
Northern Knights players
People educated at Marcellin College, Bulleen